Natasha Radski is a British actress.

Career
Radski has played lead roles in theatre productions including Antigone in the tragedy Antigone by Jean Anouilh, Yvonne in My Wife's Dead Mother by Georges Feydeau, Lucile in Love and the Piano by Georges Feydeau, Lidia Astafieva in The House with a View in the Field. by Alexander Vampilov.

Natasha Radski got her first TV role in David Croft's sitcom Here Comes the Queen, 2008. She has played Mrs. Kominski, a guest appearance in Citizen Khan BBC series, 2016, and has worked in a guest role of the Eastern-European character Daga opposite British comedian Jo Brand in Damned Channel 4 series, 2018, produced by Lionsgate and What Larks! Productions.

She has played the role of Russian News Reader in HBO / Sky Atlantic Chernobyl.

Radski has worked for BBC Radio 4 drama and played the variety of characters. She was a sole reader of the comedy Woman of Your Dreams, played a title role, Chechen terrorist Yara in Forty-Three Fifty-Nine: Yara, Russian trafficked girl Anya in Ariel, Ukrainian nuclear scientist Tanya Moroz in The King of Pripyat, and Polish immigrant Magda who had to make difficult life choices in Dreaming in English.                                                                                                                                                                                                                                                                                                                                                                                                                                                                                                                                                                                                                                                                                                                                                                                                                                                                                                                                                                                                                                                                                                                                                                                                                                                                                                                                                                                                                                                                                                                                                                                                                                                                                                                                                                                                                                                                                                                                                                                                                                                                                                                                                                                                                                                                                                                                                                                                                                                                                                                                                                                                                                                                                                                                                                                                                                                                                                                                                                                                                                                                                                                                                                                                                                                                                                                                                                                                                                                                                                                                                                                                                                                                                                                                                                                                                                                                                                                                                                                                                                                                                                                                                                                                                                                                                                                                                                                                                                                                                                                                                                                                                                                                                                                                                                                                                                                                                                                                                                                                                                                                                                                                                                                                                                                                                                                                                                                                                                                                                                                                                                                                                                                                                                                                                                                                                                                                                                                                                                                                                                                                                                                                                                                                                                                                                                                                                                                                                                                                                                                                                                                                     She was also a supporting character Edita, a Croatian friend in Josh Howie's Losing It.

She has voiced the BAFTA award-winning computer game "Half-Life 2" (Russian version). Radski has also played Lena Korolev in "Doctor Who, Singularity", an audio drama produced by Big Finish Productions.

Filmography

Television

Video games

External links
 
 Natasha Radski Official Website

References

Living people
Year of birth missing (living people)
British television actresses